Kristin Skogen Lund (born 11 August 1966) is a Norwegian business leader. She became CEO of Schibsted ASA in December 2018. She was the Director General of the Confederation of Norwegian Enterprise (NHO) from 2012 to 2018.

Background and education
Kristin Skogen Lund grew up in Oslo. She attended University of Oregon in Eugene, where she obtained the BA with honours in International Studies and Business Administration. She obtained her MBA from INSEAD in Fontainebleau, France.
Kristin Skogen Lund graduated from the Norwegian Defence University College Executive Programme during fall 2018.<ref>Forlater midlertidig vervet som NHO-sjef - Dagens Næringsliv, 8 May 2018.</ref>

Business career
From 1992 to 1995, Kristin Skogen Lund worked as a manager in Lever Europe. In 1995, she was hired in the Coca-Cola Company and was the director of Coca-Cola Beverages Sweden from 1997 to 1998. In 1998, she was hired by Scandinavia Online and became CEO before the turn of the year. From 2003 to 2004 she was the CEO of Scanpix. In 2004, she moved to Aftenposten AS—publisher of the newspaper Aftenposten—and in 2007 became CEO. Aftenposten AS is owned 100% by Schibsted. Lund has held various board memberships within the Schibsted Group and in the Norwegian Chamber Orchestra, and she has been a member of the board of the Orkla Group.

In 2009, Kristin Skogen Lund left Aftenposten'' to become EVP (director) for Nordic activities within Telenor, in which capacity she served from February 2010 to November 2012. This included portfolio responsibility for Telenor Norway, Telenor Denmark, Telenor Sweden, Telenor Broadcast, Telenor Holding, Telenor Media and Content Services, and Telenor Digital Services, Her portfolio from September 2011 also included responsibility for development and digital services.

From 2008, Skogen Lund served as Vice President of the Confederation of Norwegian Enterprise. In April 2010, she became acting president, after Paul-Christian Rieber suddenly stepped down. During summer 2010 she was formally elected as president of the organization for two years. In 2012, she became the Director general of the Confederation of Norwegian Enterprise.

Other engagements and awards
Skogen Lund was a board member in Ericsson from 2013 until 2018. She is a member of the Audit Committee. She is Chairman of the board of the Oslo Philharmonic Orchestra, and serves on the board of Mozilla and AutoStore ASA.

Since 2015 Skogen Lund has been a member of The Global Commission on the Economy and Climate and the ILO Global Commission of the future of work. Since the same year, she has also been a member of the Executive Committee and heading the Norwegian delegation of the Trilateral Commission.

She was presented with the insignia of Knight of the French Legion of Honour in 2019, and recently headed the government appointed commission revising the Norwegian pension system.

Fortune in 2011 cited Skogen Lund among the "Fortune 50 Most Powerful Women in Business"— Skogen Lund being number 38 in the ranking. She was similarly featured on the "10 Global women on the rise" list. The Norwegian business magazine Kapital has two years in a row put her on the top of the list of Norway's most powerful women. 
In September 2012 it was made public that she will change position from president to chief executive of the Confederation of Norwegian Enterprise from 1 November 2012.

References 

1966 births
Living people
Norwegian expatriates in the United States
Norwegian Lutherans
21st-century Norwegian businesswomen
21st-century Norwegian businesspeople
Norwegian media executives
20th-century Norwegian businesswomen
20th-century Norwegian businesspeople
Norwegian business executives
Norwegian women business executives
University of Oregon alumni